Sandwell Academy is a secondary school and sixth form with academy status located in West Bromwich in the West Midlands, England. The school opened in 2006 and has since opened a new, on-site building with various fitness, IT and classroom facilities.

The school is sponsored by the Worshipful Company of Mercers, Thomas Telford School, HSBC Education Trust, Tarmac Group and West Bromwich Albion F.C. The school has specialisms in Sport and Business Enterprise and has additional facilities to support the specialisms.

Sandwell Academy operates a wide catchment area which includes all of West Bromwich and the entirety of Sandwell. The school achieved an 'Outstanding' rating in its most recent Ofsted inspection (2014).

Notable former pupils include footballer Jerome Sinclair.

References

External links
Sandwell Academy official website

West Bromwich
Secondary schools in Sandwell
Academies in Sandwell
Educational institutions established in 2006
2006 establishments in England